LEAP is an extension to the ALGOL 60 programming language which provides an associative memory of triples. The three items in a triple denote the association that an Attribute of an Object has a specific Value.  LEAP was created by Jerome Feldman (University of California Berkeley) and Paul Rovner (MIT Lincoln Lab) in 1967.  LEAP was also implemented in SAIL.

References
 Feldman, Jerome A. and Paul D. Rovner (Jan, 1968).  "The LEAP language and data structure", MIT Lincoln Laboratory, Lexington, MA.  In abbreviated form, Proc. 1968 IFIP Congress, Brandon Systems Press, Princeton, NJ.
 Feldman, Jerome A. and Paul D. Rovner (Aug, 1969).  "An ALGOL-based associative language", Communications of the ACM, 12:8, pp 439 - 449.
 Rovner, Paul D (Dec, 1968).  "The LEAP users manual", MIT Lincoln Laboratory, Lexington, MA.
 VanLehn, Kurt A. (Jul, 1973).  "SAIL User Manual", Stanford Artificial Intelligence Laboratory, Stanford, CA.

Structured programming languages
Procedural programming languages
Programming languages created in 1967
Knowledge representation